The SoftBank Vision Fund is a venture capital fund founded in 2017 that is part of the SoftBank Group. With over $100 billion in capital, it is the world's largest technology-focused investment fund. In 2019, SoftBank Vision Fund 2 was founded. The total fair value of both funds as of 31 March 2021 was $154 billion. By 2023, the dismal performance of the fund had cast a shadow over the initial exuberance of both the fund and Masayoshi Son, the founder and largest shareholder of the SoftBank Group.

History 
The Softbank Vision Fund was created in May 2017 by the Softbank Group and the Public Investment Fund (PIF). $100 billion was raised with PIF contributing $45 billion, SoftBank contributing $28 billion, the Mubadala Investment Company contributing $15 billion and the rest from other investors including Apple. Through Softbank Vision Fund, Masayoshi Son explained his intent to invest in all companies developing technologies in line with the global artificial intelligence trends, including various sectors such as finance or transportation.

In July 2019, SoftBank announced the creation of SoftBank Vision Fund 2 with investors from technology companies such as Microsoft, Apple and Foxconn as well as financial service companies such as Standard Chartered, Mizuho Bank, Sumitomo Mitsui Banking Corporation and MUFG Bank. The National Investment Corporation of National Bank of Kazakhstan was also an investor. Saudi Arabia was not an investor in the second fund. The fund was reported to focus on AI-based technology and reach an investment of approximately $108 billion, of which $38 billion would come from Softbank itself.

In January 2020, multiple Softbank-funded startups started cutting their staff, such as at Getaround, Oyo, Rappi, Katerra and Zume. In February 2020, Elliott Management, an activist hedge fund, bought a $2.5 billion stake in Softbank and pushed for restructuration and more transparency, especially regarding its Vision Fund. With many portfolio companies of the first fund not performing well and high profile debacles such as the buyout of Wework after its failed Initial public offering, investor confidence in the Vision Fund fell. In May 2020, Softbank announced the Vision Fund lost $18 billion leading to 15% of the fund's 500 staff being laid off. As a result, the Vision Fund 2 raised less than half of its $108 billion goal with all of it being funded by Softbank itself after failure to secure commitments from external investors.

In May 2021, SoftBank announced the total fair value of both funds as of 31 March 2021 was $154 billion and the Vision Funds made a record profit of $36.99 billion due to its successful investment in Coupang. After announcing the success, SoftBank raised the size of Vision Fund 2 to $30 billion and stated it plans to continue self funding the second fund although it might consider trying again to secure funding from external investors. Also in May 2021, Bloomberg reported that Vision Fund could become public through a $300 million SPAC in 2021, listing in Amsterdam.

In 2022, SoftBank Vision Fund posted a record 3.5 trillion yen loss ($27.4 billion) for its financial year ended on 31 March 2022 as the valuation of its stock portfolio plummeted.

In July 2022, CEO Rajeev Misra announced he would be stepping back from some of his main roles including the management of SoftBank Vision Fund 2. Several other executives stepped down from their roles in the same year.

In August 2022, the Vision fund announced a loss of $23.1 billion for the April–June quarter and that it would be planning to cut headcounts. Eric J. Savitz, associate editor for technology at Barron's, characterized the SoftBank Vision Fund as a failed experiment. Masayoshi Son said at the time he was “embarrassed” and “ashamed” when he was confronted with SoftBank Vision Fund's dismal performance and The Wall Street Journal called SoftBank a “big loser" while Bloomberg elaborated on “Masayoshi Son’s broken business model." Son's investing strategy in the first and second SoftBank Vision Funds established in 2017 and 2019, was being described as one reliant on the greater fool theory and the lackluster performance of its investments and Masayoshi Son’s presentations in face of that, have been ridiculed by specialized media.

By early 2023, having lost its exuberance due to serious profitability issues and facing declining return on investment prospects, the once world’s biggest investor in startups had invested just $300 million into startups in the last October–December quarter, down more than 90% from the previous year.

Business overview 
SoftBank Vision Fund is managed by SoftBank Investment Advisers and SoftBank Vision Fund 2 is managed by SoftBank Global Advisors. Both are subsidiaries of the SoftBank Group. The firm has an investment team that will evaluate and select companies for the funds to invest in. Investments made mostly are either venture capital or private equity type ones. Most of the investments in Silicon Valley companies have been more than $100 million.

SoftBank Investment Advisers is headquartered in London with additional main offices in Silicon Valley and Tokyo. It also has other offices in Abu Dhabi, Hong Kong, Mumbai, Riyadh, Shanghai and Singapore. The current CEO is Rajeev Misra, who was previously SoftBank's head of strategic finance.

The largest investor of the first Vision Fund is the Public Investment Fund of Saudi Arabia contributing $45 billion of the $100 billion fund. Other investors include Softbank, Mubadala as well as technology firms, Foxconn, Qualcomm, Sharp and Apple. The second Vision Fund is solely funded by Softbank itself after failure to secure commitment from external investors due to underwhelming performance of its predecessor.

Notable investments 

 Arm Ltd.
 Automation Anywhere
 ByteDance
 C2FO
 Cohesity
 Compass
 Coupang
 Cruise
 DiDi
 Digits
 DoorDash
 eToro
 Fanatics
 Flipkart
 Flexport
 Fungible Inc.
 Getaround
 Grab
 Improbable
 Kabbage
 Katerra
 Klarna
 Lenskart
 Mapbox
 Nvidia
 OneWeb
 Opendoor
 OurCrowd
 Oyo Rooms
 Ping An Good Doctor
 PolicyBazaar
 Rappi
 Revolut
 Roivant Sciences
 Slack
 Swiggy
 The Hut Group
 Uber
 Unacademy
 View, Inc.
 Wag
 WeWork
 Wiliot
 ZhongAn
 Zume
 Zymergen

References

External links
 www.visionfund.com (Company Website)

Financial services companies established in 2017
Financial services companies based in London
Public Investment Fund
SoftBank Group
Venture capital firms of the United Kingdom